The 2014 Antenna Awards were held on 1 October 2014 at the Deakin Edge at Federation Square in Melbourne. The ceremony was announced on 1 July 2014, and recognised excellence in Australian community television of the eligibility period, running from 1 January 2013 to 31 May 2014.

It was hosted by comedian and former Studio A presenter Tegan Higginbotham. The ceremony was broadcast live on C31 Melbourne, and relayed on delay to TVS Sydney, 31 Digital Brisbane and WTV Perth. On 21 May 2015, the ceremony was made available to stream on YouTube.

Awards were presented in 13 categories. Program of the Year was awarded to No Limits, while Outstanding Female Personality and Outstanding Male Personality were awarded to Phyllis Foundis and Chris Gibson respectively.

This was the 8th Antenna Awards ceremony, revived to celebrate 20 years since the first broadcasts of community television in Melbourne and Brisbane. Weeks before the ceremony was held, the Minister for Communications, Malcolm Turnbull, announced that community television stations would no longer be licensed to access terrestrial broadcast spectrum from January 2016. While subsequent license extensions were granted, it would be the last Antenna Awards to air on terrestrial television in Sydney and Brisbane.

Performers

Winners and nominees

References

External links
 
 

 08
2014 television awards
2014 in Australian television
Australian community television
2010s in Melbourne